"U-Digg" is a song by American rappers Lil Baby and 42 Dugg featuring fellow American rapper Veeze. It was released on June 17, 2022 and was produced by Antt Beatz.

Composition
Shawn Grant of The Source described the song as having a "blend of Atlanta and Detroit brings the familiar energy of Baby and Dugg that is previously heard on street classics like 'We Paid.'" In the song, the three rappers "weave within each other", and deliver "boastful" lyrics about "wealth, women and weapons".

Music video
The music video was directed by Lil Baby himself and released alongside the single. It begins with Lil Baby having a phone call. He, 42 Dugg and Veeze then each walk down a staircase with bags of money. Through most of the video, the three are surrounded by Maybachs and Campagna T-Rex's, while showing off how much money they have. Lil Baby is also seen riding around in luxury vehicles and "bench pressing" his stacks of money.

Charts

References

2022 singles
2022 songs
Lil Baby songs
42 Dugg songs
Songs written by Lil Baby
Songs written by 42 Dugg
Motown singles
Songs written by Drumma Boy
Songs written by Jeezy